Philipp Gaßner (born 8 August 2003) is a Liechtensteiner footballer who currently plays for Dornbirn and the Liechtenstein national team.

Club career
In June 2022 Gaßner left AKA Vorarlberg and signed his first professional contract with FC Dornbirn 1913 of the Austrian 2. Liga. The contract was initially a 2-year deal with a club option for another.

International career
He is a member of the Liechtenstein national football team, making his debut in a 2022–23 UEFA Nations League match against Latvia on 14 June 2022. Gaßner has also made seven appearances for the Liechtenstein U21 to date.

Career statistics

International

References

External links

OFB profile

2003 births
Living people
Liechtenstein footballers
Association football forwards
Liechtenstein international footballers